Julien Gouyet was a French priest, credited with discovering the House of the Virgin Mary. In 1881, led by the visions of Jesus of the Blessed Anne Catherine Emmerich (Klemens Brentano, 1852) Gouyet discovered a house near Ephesus in Turkey, said to be the House of the Virgin Mary. Pope Leo XIII visited in 1896,  and in 1951 Pope Pius XII declared it a Holy Place. Pope John XXIII made the declaration permanent, and popes Paul VI (1967), John Paul II (1979) and Benedict XVI (2006) all visited the shrine.

See also
 Marie de Mandat-Grancey

References

19th-century French Roman Catholic priests
Year of death missing
Year of birth missing